Eugenio Carrasco Morales (1926 − 21 December 2013), better known by his stage name "El Perlo de Triana", was a Spanish singer, musician and poet.

Born in Málaga, Andalusia, he was raised in Seville. He was soon sponsored by La Niña de los Peines.

Eugenio Carrasco Morales died on 21 December 2013, aged 87, at a hospital in Seville, Andalusia.

References

1926 births
2013 deaths
People from Málaga
20th-century Spanish poets
Singers from Andalusia
20th-century Spanish musicians
20th-century Spanish male singers
20th-century Spanish singers